The 2012 Carlisle City Council election took place on 3 May 2012 to elect members of Carlisle District Council in Cumbria, England. One third of the council was up for election and the Labour Party gained overall control of the council from no overall control.

After the election, the composition of the council was:
Labour 27
Conservative 20
Liberal Democrats 2
Independent 2
Vacant 1

Background
After the last election in 2011 Labour were the largest party with 24 seats, while the Conservatives had 22, the Liberal Democrats had 4 and there were 2 independents. However the Conservatives continued to lead the council with Liberal Democrat support, meaning that before the 2012 election Labour needed to make 2 gains to take control of the council. One seat was vacant at the 2012 election in Harraby after the death of Labour councillor Dave Weedall in April 2012.

17 seats were contested in 2012 and as well as Conservative and Labour candidates, there were also 11 candidates each from the UK Independence Party and the Green Party, 8 candidates from the Liberal Democrats, 2 independents and 1 candidate each from the Trade Unionist and Socialist Coalition and the British National Party. The election in Carlisle brought national politicians to support their parties, with both the Conservative Prime Minister David Cameron and the Labour Leader of the Opposition Ed Miliband visiting Carlisle during the campaign.

Election result
Labour became the first party to have a majority on Carlisle City Council since 2003, after taking 2 seats each from the Conservatives and Liberal Democrats. This took Labour to 27 of the 52 seats on the council, while the Conservatives dropped to 20 councillors and the Liberal Democrats fell to 2 seats. There remained 2 independents and a further seat was vacant. Overall turnout at the election was 33.9%.

The Labour gains from the Conservatives came in Belle Vue and Yewdale wards, with Labour across the seats contested winning 4,530 more votes than Conservatives. Meanwhile, the Liberal Democrats only held one seat in Dalston, where sitting councillor Trevor Allison was re-elected, after losing two seats in Castle and Morton to Labour.

Following the election the Labour group leader Joe Hendry became the new leader of Carlisle City Council, while John Mallinson became leader of the Conservative group on the council, after defeating the Conservative leader of the council from 1999 to 2012, Mike Mitchelson, in a leadership election.

Ward results

By-elections between 2012 and 2014

Harraby
A by-election was held in Harraby on 21 June 2012 after the death of the longest serving councillor, Labour's Dave Weedall. The seat was held for Labour by Donald Forrester with a majority of 457 votes over Conservative Keith Mellen.

Yewdale
A by-election was held in Yewdale on 5 September 2013 after the death of the former leader of the council, Labour's Joe Hendry. The seat was held for Labour by Tom Dodd with a majority of 263 votes over Conservative Christina Finlayson.

Dalston
A by-election was held in Dalston on 17 October 2013 after Conservative councillor Nicola Clarke resigned from the council as she was moving away from the area. The seat was gained for the Liberal Democrats by Michael Gee with a majority of 30 votes over Conservative Michael Randall.

References

2012 English local elections
2012
2010s in Cumbria